Blue-Sky Research is the third major label album by American alternative metal band Taproot which was released on August 15, 2005 internationally and a day later in the United States. Smashing Pumpkins frontman Billy Corgan co-wrote three songs on the album. Deftones guitarist Stephen Carpenter and Jonah Matranga from Far and Onelinedrawing make guest appearances. The band wrote over 80 songs for the effort. "Calling" was released as the first single and was a moderate hit, while the second single, "Birthday", followed quietly. It is Taproot's last album with Atlantic Records, as both parties have decided to part ways. It has a different, softer, more alternative melody from the first two albums. The album has sold over 150,000 copies in the U.S.

Critical reception 

Blue-Sky Research garnered mixed reviews from music critics who admired the genre shift and lush production but found it wasted with angst-filled lyrics. Corey Hoffy of AbsolutePunk praised the album for Wright's stellar production, the band's controlled instrumentation and Richards's lyrics approaching close to political territory, concluding that "this remains their most complex and best album to date." Vik Bansal of musicOMH praised the band for taking a melodic approach to the record along with their standard nu-metal formula, concluding that "Depending on your point of view, Blue-Sky Research will either come across as hopelessly unfocused or else one of the more ambitious and versatile rock albums to emerge for quite a while. With the consistent strength of the tunes here, I lean towards the latter." Johnny Loftus of AllMusic found the self-deprecating lyrics formulaic at times but found the contributions of Corgan and Matranga to the record a nice addition to the band's improved musicianship, saying that "even without the hired guns Blue-Sky Research is the most dynamic Taproot album yet (the self-penned "So Eager" proves that), and the album's heightened textures and less predictable turns successfully updates the band's sound." Rolling Stones Christian Hoard said that despite the band adding elements of modern rock and electronica to its brand of nu-metal, the album's songs get "dragged down by melodrama and the kind of adenoidal choruses that Incubus do much better." Mikael Wood, writing for Blender, felt that the band was starting to become a relic of its given genre, saying that "On their third album, their lean Everydude grind—processed guitars stacked atop booming arena-rock drums—probes their feelings of insignificance in an all-too-workmanlike fashion."

Track listing

Notes 
 "Calling" was released in late 2005. It was used by the WWE as the theme song for their Unforgiven pay-per-view event in 2005.
 Received radio airplay on June 27, 2005.
 Music video premiered on MTV.com.
 Another song titled "Who's to Say" was recorded during the Blue-Sky Research sessions but was not included because of record politics. Stephen Richards was hoping for it to be a single, but was disappointed that it did not make the final cut. The song was, however, available for download on the band's official MySpace page for a limited time, and would later be included on the band's boxset Besides in 2018.
 "Facepeeler" was supposed to be the band's third single, but because of record politics and poor album sales, it did not make it as a single. However, the band did have a contest for fans to create a music video.

Credits 
Credits for Blue-Sky Research adapted from AllMusic.

Taproot
 Mike DeWolf - Art conception, composer, design direction, guitar
 Philip Lipscomb - Bass, composer
 Jarrod Montague - Composer, drums
 Stephen Richards - Composer, guitar, vocals

Production
 Keith Armstrong - Assistant engineer
 Elliott Blakey - Engineer
 Trevor Cole - Guitar technician
 Lanre Gaba - Artist coordination
 Eric Hackett - Drum technician
 Dmitar Krnjaic - Assistant engineer
 Chris Lord-Alge - Mixing
 Vlado Meller - Mastering
 Craig Rosen - Artist coordination
 Mindy Ryu - Layout design
 Mark Santangelo - Assistant
 Tom Storms - A&R
 Nitin Vadukul - Photography
 Mark Wakefield - A&R
 Toby Wright - Engineer, producer

Charts 
Album - Billboard (North America)

Singles - Billboard (North America)

References 

2005 albums
Taproot (band) albums
Atlantic Records albums
Albums produced by Toby Wright